The Life of the Party is a 1937 American musical comedy film produced by RKO. It was directed by William A. Seiter and starred Joe Penner, Gene Raymond, Parkyakarkus and Harriet Hilliard. It recorded a loss of $111,000.

Plot
Aspiring singer Mitzi Mantos and her agent Pauline are on their way to Santa Barbara, California by train. Also on the train are society scion Barry Saunders accompanied by Oliver. Barry will lose an inheritance of 3 million dollars if he marries before the age of 30 and Oliver was hired by Barry's mother to assure this.  Mitzi and Barry meet when her slipper is caught between two railroad cars and he falls for her. Unfortunately she disappears without him getting her name but leaving the shoe behind.

All four check into the same hotel where Barry hires hotel detective Parky to find the mysterious girl. Pauline tries to get an audition for Mitzi with Dr. Molnac for his traveling musical revue. Mitzi's mother, Countess Mantos, arrives also at the hotel, together with her friend Mrs. Penner and son Joe Penner. Both women have intentions to marry Mitzi to Joe. Barry meets Mitzi finally and proposes marriage to her three years in the future. Misunderstandings lead to a situation that Mitzi and Barry must pretend that they are married. Hearing that, Countess Mantos orders at once the bridal suite of the hotel for the young couple.

Pauline and Oliver organize a wedding party with Dr. Molnac's troupe performing. In addition Pauline schemes to get Mitzi the audition. She hires Parky and Joe to prevent Dr. Molnac's singer, Susan, to perform. Mitzi, taking her place, is a hit. Barry's mother arrives, informed by Oliver. She admits having lied about her and Barry's age for years. Barry is indeed thirty since his last birthday four months ago.

Cast

 Joe Penner as Penner
 Gene Raymond as Barry
 Parkyakarkus as Parky
 Harriet Hilliard as Mitzi
 Victor Moore as Oliver
 Helen Broderick as Pauline
 Billy Gilbert as Dr. Molnac
 Ann Miller as Betty

 Richard Lane as Hotel Manager
 Franklin Pangborn as Beggs 
 Margaret Dumont as Mrs. Penner
 Ann Shoemaker as Countess Martos 
 Betty Jane Rhodes as Susan
 George Irving as Mr. Van Tuyl
 Winifred Harris as Mrs. Van Tuyl
 Charles Judels as Maitre d'Hotel

References

External links
 
 
 
 

1937 films
1937 musical comedy films
American musical comedy films
American black-and-white films
Films directed by William A. Seiter
1930s American films